The Bills–Titans rivalry is a National Football League rivalry between the Buffalo Bills and the Tennessee Titans. The series originated during the American Football League's inaugural season in 1960, as both the Titans, then known as the Houston Oilers, and Bills were charter teams in the league, playing as divisional opponents in the AFL's East division. Despite being moved to different divisions following the AFL–NFL merger, the Bills and Oilers/Titans have had several heated competitions since, including two of the most memorable moments in NFL playoff history, namely The Comeback and the Music City Miracle. Since 1999, several games have been decided by less than a touchdown.

History

1960–1978: AFL dominance and league merger
When the American Football League was founded, the Bills and Oilers were placed in the AFL East division. Both Buffalo, New York and Houston, Texas had been passed over for National Football League franchises during recent expansion talks at that point, with Bills founder Ralph Wilson and Oilers founder Bud Adams becoming part of what would now be called the "Foolish Club" for their venture as part of the fledgling AFL. Nonetheless, the two teams dominated the AFL, combining for four league championships, two each, as well as seven divisional titles. After then AFL merged with the NFL following the 1969 season, Houston would be moved to the AFC Central division, while Buffalo and the other AFL East teams would be joined by the Baltimore Colts to form the AFC East division.

Despite several competitive games from 1960 to 1966 as divisional rivals, Houston won 10 straight games from 1967 to 1978, long after the two teams were separated into different divisions.

1983–1999: Pivotal playoff matchups and the Oilers' move to Tennessee

With Buffalo now being led by quarterback Jim Kelly and Houston by Warren Moon, several marquee matchups occurred during the late 1980s and 1990s after a 5-year hiatus in the series between 1978 and 1983. During this era, the two franchises would play three postseason games against each other, with the first contest being a 17–10 Bills win in the 1988 AFC divisional round. The latter two competitions would have major adverse effects on the losers.

After beating the Bills 27–3 during the final game of the 1992 season, Houston rematched the Bills at Rich Stadium in the wild card round. Despite being up 35–3 at one point against an injury-depleted Buffalo team missing Kelly, running back Thurman Thomas, and others, the Oilers were unable to prevent Bills backup quarterback Frank Reich from engineering what is now the largest playoff comeback in NFL history, as Buffalo ultimately won 41–38 in overtime. While "The Comeback" is now considered one of the proudest moments in Bills history, as they would go on to their third of four consecutive Super Bowl appearances, the Oilers arguably never recovered from this loss, with Houston fans now calling this game "The Choke". Despite making the playoffs again the following season, tension among players and coaches, in addition to several off-field incidents, became widely reported. The team's drama boiled over during Houston's loss in the wild-card round that year. Within the next few years, the team's core players, including Moon, were sent away and after several unsuccessful seasons, Bud Adams decided to move the Oilers to Nashville, Tennessee, with an interim stop in Memphis, to become the Tennessee Titans. Houston sports radio host Rich Lord said in 2013 that "The Choke" and other Oilers playoff losses were among reasons why the team relocated.

After the Titans rebranded themselves two years into their move to Nashville, they would host the Bills in the 1999 AFC wild card round at the newly completed Adelphia Coliseum. While the Titans now featured new players such as quarterback Steve McNair and running back Eddie George, much of the Bills' core, namely Thomas, Andre Reed, and Bruce Smith were at the end of their careers, while their veteran quarterback Doug Flutie was controversially benched for Rob Johnson. In what would become a defensive struggle, Johnson led the Bills to a go-ahead field goal late in the fourth quarter, losing his shoe in the process, to put Buffalo up 16–15. However, on the ensuing kickoff, the Titans scored the game-winning touchdown in what would now become known as the Music City Miracle, as tight end Frank Wycheck, corralling the ball from Lorenzo Neal, threw a lateral pass to Kevin Dyson, who returned it untouched for the score. Though the ball appeared to travel forward, further review, confirmed by a computer analyst who studied the play years later, determined that the pass was indeed a lateral. Tennessee went on to appear in Super Bowl XXXIV after the win while Buffalo did not appear in the postseason again until 2017.

Overall, Buffalo held the advantage in the series from 1983 to 1999 at 8–6, including winning 8 of 11 games between 1983 and 1994 after 10 consecutive losses.

2000–2017: Bills' decline and concurrent playoff droughts
Following the Music City Miracle, Buffalo would suffer a major decline of its own; after beating Tennessee in a Sunday Night Football rematch the following season, the Bills would not beat the Titans again until , in addition to missing the playoffs for the next 17 seasons. There were also widespread rumors the Bills would move to Toronto, stemming from the team playing several games in the Canadian metropolis as part of the Bills Toronto Series. Despite staying as one of the league's better teams for most of the 2000s, Tennessee would also miss the playoffs for 9 years after losing in the divisional round in 2008.

The 2006 matchup saw Titans rookie quarterback Vince Young lead a fourth quarter comeback to put the Titans up 30–29 with 2 minutes left. The Bills drove down the field on the ensuing drive to the Tennessee 28-yard-line, but instead of attempting the field goal on 4th-and-5, they opted to have J. P. Losman attempt a pass due to high winds, resulting in the game-sealing interception. Tennessee would also be eliminated with a loss the following week, squandering a 6-game winning streak after starting 2–7.

In 2009, the Bills and Titans were honored as two of the original AFL teams, with their matchup being featured as one of the "AFL Legacy" games to honor the 50th anniversary of the AFL's founding. Bud Adams, who maintained a friendly rivalry with Ralph Wilson, was fined $250,000 by the league following the 41–17 Titans win in which he obscenely gestured towards the Bills sideline. Adams and Wilson were the last living original AFL owners at that time, with the two dying in 2013 and 2014, respectively.

During the 2015 game in which Buffalo finally ended a five-game losing streak in the series, quarterback Tyrod Taylor accounted for two touchdowns in the second half while setting a then-franchise record for quarterback rushing yards in a game, paving the way for a 14–13 Bills comeback win in Nashville as the Bills defense also stifled Titans rookie quarterback Marcus Mariota. It was the second of three straight matchups between the Bills and Titans decided by just one point.

2018–present

In his rookie season in 2018, Bills quarterback Josh Allen led Buffalo to a 13–12 victory over the Titans, accomplishing his first career come-from-behind win. After a Buffalo 14–7 win in 2019, in which Titans kicker Cairo Santos missed 4 field goals before being cut, the teams were set to rematch in 2020 before several COVID–19 infections ravaged the Titans organization and forced the game's rescheduling from a Sunday afternoon to a Tuesday night, marking the first time since 2010 that an NFL regular-season game was played on a Tuesday. Despite this, Tennessee routed the Bills 42–16 behind a strong performance by new quarterback Ryan Tannehill and several Bills turnovers, staying unbeaten while handing Buffalo its first loss of that year.

During a hotly contested Monday Night game, the lead changed seven times throughout during an offensive shootout, as Allen and Titans running back Derrick Henry both turned in strong performances. The game was decided in the final minutes, when Allen was stopped by the Titans defense on a crucial 4th-and-1 at the Tennessee 3-yard line, allowing the Titans to win 34–31. Both teams won their respective divisions in 2021, but the Titans' victory over the Bills (along with a win against the Kansas City Chiefs the following week) allowed them to clinch the AFC's top seed while Buffalo had to settle for the third seed. Both teams lost in the divisional round.

Despite the heated matchups and recurrent success of both teams, they have yet to meet in the postseason in the 21st century.

Game results

|-
| 1960
| Tie 1–1
| style="| Bills  25–24
| style="| Oilers  31–23
| Tie  1–1
| Inaugural season for both teams and the AFL. Oilers win 1960 AFL Championship
|-
| 1961
| Tie 1–1
| style="| Oilers  28–16
| style="| Bills  22–12
| Tie  2–2
| Oilers win 1961 AFL Championship
|-
| 1962
| style="| 
| style="| Oilers  17–14 
| style="| Oilers  28–23| Oilers  4–2
| 
|-
| 1963
| style="| | style="| Oilers  31–20| style="| Oilers  28–14| Oilers  6–2
| 
|-
| 1964
| style="| | style="| Bills  24–10| style="| Bills  48–17| Oilers  6–4
| Bills win 1964 AFL Championship.
|-
| 1965
| Tie 1–1| style="| Oilers  19–17| style="| Bills  29–18| Oilers  7–5
| Bills win 1965 AFL Championship.
|-
| 1966
| style="| | style="| Bills  27–20| style="| Bills  42–20| Tie  7–7
| 
|-
| 1967
| style="| | style="| Oilers  20–3| style="| Oilers  10–3| Oilers  9–7
| 
|-
| 1968
| style="| | style="| Oilers  30–7| style="| Oilers  35–6| Oilers  11–7
| 
|-
| 1969
| style="| | style="| Oilers  17–3| style="| Oilers  28–14| Oilers  13–7
| Last year in series as divisional rivals and before AFL–NFL merger
|-

|-
| 
| style="| Oilers  20–14| War Memorial Stadium
| Oilers  14–7
| First meeting as fellow members of American Football Conference
|-
| 
| style="| Oilers  21–9| Rich Stadium
| Oilers  15–7
| 
|-
| 
| style="| Oilers  13–3| Rich Stadium
| Oilers  16–7
| 
|-
| 
| style="| Oilers  17–10| Houston Astrodome
| Oilers  17–7
| Oilers win 10 straight meetings
|-

|-
| 
| style="| Bills  30–13| Rich Stadium
| Oilers  17–8
| 
|-
| 
| style="| Bills  20–0| Rich Stadium
| Oilers  17–9
| 
|-
| 
| style="| Oilers  20–0| Houston Astrodome
| Oilers  18–9
| First meeting between quarterbacks Warren Moon and Jim Kelly
|-
| 
| style="| Bills  34–30| Rich Stadium
| Oilers  18–10
| 
|- style="font-weight:bold; background:#f2f2f2;"
| 1988 playoffs
| style="| Bills  17–10| Rich Stadium
| Oilers  18–11
| AFC Divisional Round. First postseason meeting between the two teams.
|-
| 
| style="| Bills  47–41 (OT)| Houston Astrodome
| Oilers  18–12
| Highest scoring game in series. Bills win 5 of last 6 meetings.
|-

|-
| 
| style="| Oilers  27–24| Houston Astrodome
| Oilers  19–12
| Bills lose Super Bowl XXV
|-
| 
| style="| Oilers  27–3| Houston Astrodome
| Oilers  20–12
| Bills lose Super Bowl XXVII. Oilers' victory in week 17 denies the Bills both their division and the AFC's No. 1 seed. Setting up a rematch in Buffalo the following week.
|- style="font-weight:bold; background:#f2f2f2;"
| 1992 playoffs
| style="| Bills  41–38 (OT)| Rich Stadium
| Oilers  20–13
| AFC Wild Card Round. Bills backup QB Frank Reich leads 32-point comeback in second half, the largest in NFL history
|-
| 
| style="| Bills  35–7| Rich Stadium
| Oilers  20–14
| Final game in series for Warren Moon. Bills lose Super Bowl XXVIII
|-
| 
| style="| Bills  15–7| Houston Astrodome
| Oilers  20–15
| Final meeting in Houston before Oilers relocate to Tennessee in 1997
|-
| 
| style="| Oilers  28–17| Rich Stadium
| Oilers  21–15
| First game in series for QB Steve McNair; final game in series for Jim Kelly. Oilers first win in Buffalo since 1976.
|-
| 
| style="| Oilers  31–14| Liberty Bowl Memorial Stadium
| Oilers  22–15
| Oilers temporarily play in Memphis, Tennessee as new stadium is built in Nashville.
|- style="font-weight:bold; background:#f2f2f2;"
| 1999 playoffs
| style="| Titans  22–16| Adelphia Coliseum
| Titans  23–15
| AFC Wild Card Round. Oilers renamed Titans. Titans win on last-second kickoff return touchdown with controversial lateral pass. Titans lose Super Bowl XXXIV.
|-

|-
| 
| style="| Bills  16–13| Ralph Wilson Stadium
| Titans  23–16
| Bills avenge Music City Miracle loss on opening day
|-
| 
| style="| Titans  28–26| The Coliseum
| Titans  24–16
| Titans hold off Bills comeback with backup QB Billy Volek, eliminate Bills from playoff contention
|-
| 
| style="| Titans 30–29| Ralph Wilson Stadium
| Oilers  25–16
| QB Vince Young leads Titans to comeback win in game with playoff implications. Fourth straight game decided by less than a touchdown.
|-
| 
| style="| Titans  41–17| LP Field
| Titans  26–16
|
|-

|-
| 
| style="| Titans  23–17| Ralph Wilson Stadium
| Titans  27–16
| 
|-
| 
| style="| Titans  35–34| Ralph Wilson Stadium
| Titans  28–16
| Titans win 5 straight meetings
|-
| 
| style="| Bills  14–13| Nissan Stadium
| Titans  28–17
| Bills first win in Tennessee.
|-
| 
| style="| Bills  13–12| New Era Field
| Titans  28–18
| First game in series for QB Josh Allen and RB Derrick Henry. Third straight meeting decided by 1 point
|-
| 
| style="| Bills  14–7| Nissan Stadium
| Titans  28–19
| Titans kicker Cairo Santos misses four field goals
|-

|-
| 
| style="| Titans  42–16| Nissan Stadium
| Titans  29–19
| Game delayed several times due to COVID-19 outbreak in Titans organization
|-
| 
| style="| Titans  34–31| Nissan Stadium
| Titans  30–19
| Game features seven lead-changes
|-
| 
| style="| Bills  41–7| Highmark Stadium
| Titans  30–20
| Bills biggest win against Titans, snap 3-year losing streak
|-

|-
| Regular season
| style="|Titans 29–19| Titans 15–12 
| Titans 14–6
|  
|-
| Postseason
| style="|Bills 2–1| Bills 2–0
| Titans 1–0
| AFC Wild Card Round: 1992, 1999. AFC Divisional Round: 1988
|-
| Regular and postseason 
| style="|Titans 30–20'''
| Titans 15–14
| Titans 15–6
| 
|-

Source:

References

National Football League rivalries
Buffalo Bills
Tennessee Titans
Houston Oilers
Tennessee Titans rivalries
Buffalo Bills rivalries